"Whistle (While You Work It)" is a song by British recording artist Katy Tiz. It was written by Tiz, Kinetics & One Love, and songwriter Emily Warren for Tiz's debut studio album. It was released onto iTunes on 10 February 2015.

A Simlish (the language in most of The Sims games) version of the song was recorded and included in an expansion pack for The Sims 4, titled The Sims 4: Get to Work.

Background
Tiz said in an interview that she wrote the song about a darker period in her life where she felt like nothing was going her way, but her brother was there to tell her to chin up, keep moving, and never give up. It was cowritten with Kinetics & One Love, songwriter Emily Warren and was produced by J.R. Rotem and co-produced by Teal Douville.

Tiz said about the song in an interview: "“You may think this song is about going to the club and ‘working it’ but if you pay close attention to the lyrics, you’ll see it’s much deeper than that."

Music video
A music video for "Whistle (While You Work It)" was filmed and released by Syndrome Studio and director James Larese, and was uploaded onto Tiz's official YouTube channel on 16 April 2015.

The video combines live action with animation elements and shows Tiz interacting with a crew of animated animal friends and enjoying several activities with them such as getting their nails done, and trying out clothing.

Idolator gave the video a positive review: "Katy springs to life from street art. From there, the blond bombshell indulges in a little choreography with her girls, goes for a stroll with a crew of cartoon characters and gets her nails done. It deftly combines the live action and animation elements, and is guaranteed to put a smile on your face."

Charts

References

2015 singles
2015 songs
Songs written by Kinetics (rapper)
Songs written by One Love (record producer)
Song recordings produced by J. R. Rotem
Atlantic Records singles
Songs written by Emily Warren